"Praise" is the first single from Sevendust's 2001 release Animosity. The song also appears on their Best of (Chapter One 1997-2004) album. The song's music video was shot in Orlando, Florida, and directed by "Glen Bennett". "Praise" peaked at number 15 on the Mainstream Rock chart and number 23 on the Modern Rock chart.

Release history

References

2001 singles
Songs written by Clint Lowery
Songs written by Morgan Rose
Songs written by Lajon Witherspoon
Sevendust songs
TVT Records singles
2001 songs
Songs written by John Connolly (musician)
Songs written by Vinnie Hornsby